Ivan Loseto (born 23 February 1988) is an Italian footballer.

Biography
Born in Bari, Apulia,  Loseto started his career at A.S. Bari. In 2006–07 Serie B he entered the first team wearing no.29 shirt. In 2007–08 Serie B he changed to wear no.5 vacated by Massimiliano Scaglia. However, after the signing of Palmiro Di Dio, Loseto had to wear no.29 shirt again. In January 2008 he left for Serie C1 club Sambenedettese. In July, he remained in the same division for Hellas Verona F.C. In 2009–10 season he left for fourth division club Noicattaro, which Bari also paid part of the wage of Loseto for €20,000 in order to facilitate the deal. In summer 2010 he left for Gavorrano in 2-year contract. He also played for the club in 2011 pre-season, however he never played competitively in 2011–12 Lega Pro Seconda Divisione.

References

External links
 

1988 births
Living people
Italian footballers
Serie B players
S.S.C. Bari players
A.S. Noicattaro Calcio players
A.S. Sambenedettese players
Hellas Verona F.C. players
Association football defenders